Scott Allen Wasiluk (born May 1, 1958) is an American politician in the state of Minnesota. He served in the Minnesota House of Representatives.

References

Democratic Party members of the Minnesota House of Representatives
1958 births
Living people
People from Ramsey County, Minnesota
University of St. Thomas (Minnesota) alumni